Kevin Spencer is a former Australian racing cyclist. He won the Australian national road race title in 1972.

References

External links

Year of birth missing (living people)
Living people
Australian male cyclists
Place of birth missing (living people)